"Why Believe In You" is a song by Scottish band Texas, released as the lead single from their second studio album, Mothers Heaven (1991). It reach number 66 on the UK Singles Chart, number 33 in the Netherlands, and number 73 in Australia.

Track listings
UK 7-inch and cassette single, Australasian CD single
 "Why Believe in You"
 "How It Feels"

UK 12-inch and CD single
 "Why Believe in You"
 "How It Feels"
 "Hold Me Lord"
 A limited-edition CD box set featuring the same tracks was also released.

Japanese mini-CD single
 "Why Believe in You"
 "Hold Me Lord"

Charts

References

Texas (band) songs
1991 singles
1991 songs
Mercury Records singles
Songs written by Johnny McElhone
Songs written by Sharleen Spiteri